Pahanga is a genus of Asian araneomorph spiders in the family Tetrablemmidae that was first described by W. A. Shear in 1979.

Species
 it contains four species, found in Asia:
Pahanga centenialis Lehtinen, 1981 – Malaysia
Pahanga diyaluma Lehtinen, 1981 – Sri Lanka
Pahanga dura Shear, 1979 (type) – Malaysia
Pahanga lilisari Lehtinen, 1981 – Indonesia (Sumatra)

See also
 List of Tetrablemmidae species

References

Araneomorphae genera
Spiders of Asia
Tetrablemmidae